Dehqanabad-e Chulak (also Romanized as Dehqānābād-e Chūlak; also known as Dehqānābād) is a village in Tariq ol Eslam Rural District, in the Central District of Nahavand County, Hamadan Province, Iran. At the 2006 census, its population was 508, in 130 families.

References 

Populated places in Nahavand County